William Wood (6 November 1886 – 29 April 1971) was a British wrestler who competed in the 1908 Summer Olympics. In 1908, at the 1908 Summer Olympics, he won the silver medal in the freestyle wrestling lightweight class. He was the father of William Alan Wood.

References

External links
 

1886 births
1971 deaths
Olympic wrestlers of Great Britain
Wrestlers at the 1908 Summer Olympics
British male sport wrestlers
Olympic silver medallists for Great Britain
Olympic medalists in wrestling
Medalists at the 1908 Summer Olympics